Organ donation is when a person gives their organs after they die to someone in need of new organs. Transplantation is the process of  transplanting the organs donated into another person. This process extends the life expectancy of a person suffering from organ failure. The number of patients requiring organ transplants outweighs the number of donor organs available.

History of organ transplantation 
Australia's first organ transplants were corneal transplants in the early 1940s. Following in chronological order are monumental first in Australia's organ transplantation history.
	Early 1940s Australia began corneal transplants in Sydney and Melbourne
	1965 	Australia's first successful (living) kidney transplant 
	1984 	Australia's first successful heart transplant 
	1985 	Australia's first successful liver transplant 
	1985 	Australia's first successful kidney transplant from a deceased donor
	1986 	The Brisbane Technique for splitting livers to benefit three recipients initiated 
	1986 	Australia's first successful heart/lung transplant 
	1987 	Australia's first successful kidney/pancreas transplant 
	1987 	First segmental liver transplant (for children) (Australia)
	1989 	First successful living liver transplant (Australia)
	1990 	Australia's first successful single lung transplant 
	2002 	First single segment liver transplant on a baby (24 days old) (Australia)
	2003 	Australia's first triple transplant (heart, lung, liver)
	2006 	World's first kidney/liver/pancreas transplant (Australia) 
       2012    Australia's first pediatric intestinal transplant (liver), (small bowel), (duodenum), (pancreas)
The following table (Table 1.1) shows the global transplantation milestones in chronological order.

Table 1.1. Global transplant milestones 

Table 1.1 Source: Australian Government Tissue Donation and Transplantation Authority. http://www.donatelife.gov.au

Donor types 
There are two types of donors; living donors and deceased donors.

Living donors 
In Australia the most common living donations not including blood donations are kidneys and bone marrow. The tissues and organs that are able to be donated by a living donor are:
 Bone marrow
 Kidney
 Part of the liver
 Lung (this requires two living donors. One donates a lobe from their left lung and the other donates a lobe from their right lung) 
 Part of the intestine
 Part of the pancreas

Eligibility for donation 
The minimum age for living donation is 18 years of age. A person may be eligible to be a donor if they are free from HIV, cancer, systemic infection, sickle cell anaemia, Creutzfeldt–Jakob disease and they are not a previous IV drug user.

Motives for living donation 
Donation to a family member is a common scenario. The reasons for a family member to want to be a living donor to their relatives are; a desire to help, self benefit (from loved ones improved health), a feeling of moral duty, pressure identification with the recipient, increased self-esteem from doing a good deed. It is the health professional's role to understand the difficulty of these situations involving relationships of loved friends or relatives and they are to determine whether or not the offer of donation is genuine or the living donor feels pressured into donating because of the seriousness of their loved ones organ failure. However most donations result in a positive psychological benefit to both the donor and recipient.

If a donor is wanting to donate to someone who is not a relative or friend they are intensively psychologically tested to determine their motives and suitability for donation as there can occasionally be harmful motives such as attention seeking or mental illness.

Deceased donors (non-heart beating donors) 
Deceased donors have been declared dead and are maintained in ICU on ventilators so tissue oxygenation continues until the procedure of organ retrieval and cold preservation.

Deceased donors are divided into two sub-classes.
 Donation after brain death. A person is declared brain dead if there is complete loss of all brain function 
 Donation after cardiac death. A person is declared cardiac dead if there is complete loss of all cardiac function
Both types of deceased donors have complete and irreversible damage and returning to life is impossible. Thorough testing is carried out prior to confirming a person brain dead or cardiac dead.

One deceased donor is able to save up to ten lives by donating the following:
 Organs: Kidneys, pancreas, liver, lungs, heart and intestines
 Tissues: Bones, skin, heart valves, veins and corneas

Whole body donation 
After death some people choose to donate their bodies to science. These bodies are used in many teaching facilities and aid in teaching anatomy, surgical techniques or research. Whole body donation involves the deceased person contacting the university or teaching institution prior to death to obtain consent and cover the legalities involved. After death it is up to the family of the deceased to contact the chosen facility and arrange donation.

Opt in versus opt out 
Currently Australia's organ donation system is 'opt-in'. This means a person had to give consent (opt-in) in be a donor prior to their death, or their family can make the decision for them if they are considered a viable donor. The 'opt-out' system is used in several countries around the world. For this system everyone is placed on the donor list and must 'opt-out' if they do not wish to donate their organs. Whether Australia changes to the 'opt-out' system is constantly coming into question. In a discussion paper compiled in 2011 it was stated 35% of family members of a potential donor would refuse donation if they were unsure of the family members intentions on donating. However, if an 'opt-out' system was put into place and the potential donor did not opt-out prior to death, it was estimated only 20% of families would refuse donation.

A study carried out in 2002 investigated donor rates of countries with 'opt-in' and 'opt-out' systems. The countries chosen for the study were ones that had relatively similar backgrounds and health systems. After the donation rates were calculated to match the mortality rates it concluded the difference in donor rates between the two systems were marginal. The results as follows (Table 1.2).

Table 1.2. Three year mean organ donation and mortality rates for 10 European countries. 
Reference:

 *The rates shown comply with the definition of the council of Europe: "if at least one solid organ has been retrieved for the purpose of organ donation"
 †Mortality rates for CVA and (traffic) accidents 0–65 years 
 (I) indicates country has an 'opt-in' system 
There are many pros and cons for each of the two systems, making it a controversial topic, and as seen above some studies can be contradicting. Ultimately it is the family of the deceased who will make the final decision on organ donation. Only 57% of Australians know the wishes of their family members in regards to organ donation, which has a large impact on families giving consent for organ donation. Donation cannot go ahead without families consent even if the person is on the donor register.

Donation in religion 
In most cases religions support organ donation. However, there are a few aspects of each religion that can make the logistics of organ donation difficult.

Islam 
Most organ donations in predominately Muslim countries are live donations, for example in Iran in 2006 only 13% of renal transplants were from deceased donation. In Islam, violating the human body whether living or dead is forbidden, this includes organ donation. However, saving a life is ranked extremely highly in the Qur'an. Brain stem death (brain dead) is controversial in Islam. This, along with burial customs of Muslims being they have to be buried within 24 hours of death makes if difficult for organ donation.

Christianity 
Generally Christianity approves of organ donation although some Christians believe principle healing is achieved through prayer. The majority of Christians see organ donation as Christian love or an act of devotion to God and mankind.

Judaism 
The Jewish faith places great significance on avoiding unnecessary interference with cadavers and receiving benefit from a cadaver is prohibited. The body must also be buried within 24 hours of death. It is custom in Judaism to not interfere with death; organ donation procedures may be part of this. Only 8% of the Israel population are registered organ donors.

Hinduism 
Hindu's believe in reincarnation and the good deeds of one's current lifetime will determine the fate of the next lifetime. Organ donation is seen as a good deed. Hasmukh Velji Shah of the World Council of Hindus stated "The import issue for Hindu is that which sustains life should be accepted and promoted as Dharma (righteous living). Organ donation is an integral part of our living."

Buddhism 
Buddhists believe in rebirth. Brain death is also controversial for Buddhists as they believe the spirit remains in the body days after death and interfering with the body may affect a person's next rebirth. However, selfless giving is integral to Buddhism; therefore organ donation is up to the individual.

Donor rates in Australia 
Australian donor rates are on the rise. Between 2009 and 2013, donor numbers increased by 29%. In 2009 there were 11.4 donors per million population. By 2013 there were 16.9 donors per million population. (Table 1.3). In Australia around 1600 people are on the organ transplant waiting list at any time. Less than 1% of persons whose death is in hospital can be potential donors because of the limited circumstances for which organ donation is possible. In 2013 only 40% of patients on the organ waiting list received a transplant and 2% of the patients on the waiting list died while waiting for an organ.

Table 1.3: Donor rates in Australia per million population 
Reference:

Table 1.4. Transplanted organs 2014 in Australia 
Reference:

Australian Organ Donor Register 
The Australian Organ Donor Register is a government register. People can register to be organ donors or they can register that they wish to not be an organ donor. The register is nationwide and is the only register in Australia. Registering can be done online at the Donate Life website.

References

External links 
Australian Organ Donor Register
Healthcare in Australia
Australia
Australia